Węgliniec  is a town in Zgorzelec County, Lower Silesian Voivodeship, in south-western Poland, close to the border with Germany. It is the seat of the administrative district (gmina) called Gmina Węgliniec.

As of 2019, the town has a population of 2,846.

History

The oldest known historical mention of the settlement dates back to 1502  in the context of medieval German Ostsiedlung, receiving the name Kohlfurt.  In 1742 it was annexed by Prussia.  It was plundered by different armies during the Third Silesian War (1756–1763). In 1846 a railway line connecting Wrocław and Berlin, running through the village, was opened. In 1847 a line to Dresden was built, and in 1865 to Lubań. The settlement became an important railway junction.
During World War II, the Germans located there two prisoner-of-war labor subcamps and a forced labor camp. Near the end of World War II, in February 1945, the almost completely abandoned village was captured by the Soviets. After World War II the region was placed preliminary under Polish administration according to the post-war Potsdam Agreement. It was repopulated with Poles, some of whom were from the Eastern Borderlands, which were annexed by the Soviet Union.

Węgliniec was granted town rights in 1967.

Transport
Węgliniec railway station remains a major railway junction, located on strategic passenger and freight routes between Poland and Germany, with regular cross-border passenger services to Görlitz/Dresden and a limited service to Cottbus/Berlin.

Twin towns – sister cities
See twin towns of Gmina Węgliniec.

References

Cities and towns in Lower Silesian Voivodeship
Zgorzelec County